Te Tuve y Te Perdí (Eng.: "I Had You and I Lost You") is the second studio album released by Los Bukis in 1977.

Track listing 
All songs written and composed by Marco Antonio Solís

External links

 Te Tuve Y Te Perdi on Amazon.com
 Te Tuve Y Te Perdi on Rhapsody.com

1977 albums
Los Bukis albums